Pieskawtsy (Belarusian: Пе́скаўцы, Pieskaŭcy; Russian: Песковцы; Polish: Piaskowce) is a village in Belarus, in the Voranava Raion of Grodno Region.

History 
In the interwar period, the village was situated in Poland, in the Nowogródek Voivodeship, in the Lida County, in the Wawiorka Commune. After the Soviet invasion of Poland in 1939, the village became part of the BSSR. In the years 1941-1944 it was under German occupation. Then the village was again in the BSSR. From 1991 in the Republic of Belarus.

Murder in Pieskawtsy 
On March 12-13, 1945 in Piaskowce and the surrounding area, the NKVD Operational Group deceptively liquidated a partisan unit, murdering Home Army soldiers and its commander, Franciszek Weramowicz "Kuna". Piotr Kuźmicz, an inhabitant of the village of Kunieje, who has been collecting information about this event for a long time, relates: The NKVD group, pretending to be a "green", or "Vlasovtsy" unit under the command of Mirkowski, joined the unit in a tricky manner. Mirkowski was awarded the title of Hero of the Soviet Union for this operation. Kuna's unit consisted of the local population, two Germans and a French. There were over 50 soldiers and an underground network of reservists. The commander of "Kuna" personally knew one of the "greens" who was an NKVD agent under the pseudonym "Pierwyj". He trusted him and allowed himself to be persuaded to merge the divisions. On March 12, the "Greens" (OG NKVD) began to liquidate the Home Army unit in the village of Pieskawtsy, using knives, axes and firearms. In the morning, the commander Franciszek Weramowicz was murdered in the "greens" headquarters, during the day, in the forest near the village of Dainowa, the Home Army patrols were murdered, and in the evening the general murder began in the village of Pieskawtsy. According to the documents, 36 people were killed then. The bodies of those murdered in Pieskawtsy were taken by the police to Radun for recognition. Those killed on patrols were buried in the forest near the village of Dainowa. Some of the Home Army soldiers, including the Germans and the French, broke away through the ring of Soviet troops surrounding the village of Pieskawtsy. At dawn on March 13, 1945, the NKVD started murdering the discovered reservists from the underground network in the villages of: Siewruki, Bobrowniki, Zaprudziany, Smilginie, Lipkunce, Rukance, Kurdziuki. Then 23 people were murdered in a brutal manner. The murdered rested in the cemeteries adjacent to these villages.

On the right side of the road Zieniewicze - Pieskawtsy, at the crossroads to the village of Dainowa, a high wooden cross, painted blue, was erected. In 2011, a metal cross with a granite plaque commemorating those murdered on March 12-13, 1945 was placed on a stone mound. The plaque was destroyed in 2022.

References

Villages in Belarus